Cassidula nucleus is a species of air-breathing marine snail, a pulmonate gastropod mollusk in the family Ellobiidae.

Distribution 
Cassidula nucleus occurs in India, Vietnam, Malaysia, China.

Description

The shell length of an adult snail is 16.0 mm.

Ecology
Cassidula nucleus is a predominantly mangrove-associated species.

References

External links 
 Dious S. R. J. & Kasinathan R. (1994). "Tolerance limits of two pulmonate snails Cassidula nucleus and Melampus ceylonicus from Pitchavaram mangroves". Environment and ecology, Kalyani, 12(4): 845-849.

Ellobiidae
Gastropods described in 1791
Taxa named by Johann Friedrich Gmelin